The Newfoundland and Labrador English School District is the school board overseeing all English-language primary and secondary education in the Canadian province of Newfoundland and Labrador. In June 2018, NLESD held jurisdiction over 256 schools serving more than 65,000 students across the province. It was created in 2013 as part of the amalgamation of all provincial school boards into an English-language and a French-language board. There had previously been four English-language school boards in the province: the Nova Central School District, Eastern School District, Labrador School Board, and Western School Board.

List of Schools

Former Eastern School District

Avalon East Regional Schools
 Mary Queen of the World Elementary School
 Baltimore School Complex
Bishops College
 Booth Memorial High School
 Gonzaga Regional High School
Holy Heart of Mary High School
Holy Spirit High School
 Holy Trinity High School
 Janeway Hospital School
 Mobile Central High School
 Mount Pearl Senior High School
 O'Donel High School
 Prince of Wales Collegiate
 Queen Elizabeth Regional High School
 St. Anne's Academy
 St. Kevin's High School
 St. Michael's High School

Avalon West Regional Schools
 Ascension Collegiate
 Baccalieu Collegiate
 Carbonear Collegiate
 Crescent Collegiate

Burin Regional Schools
 Christ the King School (Dunne Memorial Academy)
 Fatima Academy
 Laval High School
 Roncalli Central High School
 St. Catherine's Academy
 Christ the King School
 Fortune Bay Academy
 Holy Name of Mary
 John Burke High School
 Marystown Central High
 St. Joseph's Academy
 St. Joseph's All Grade
 St. Lawrence Academy

Vista Regional Schools 
(including Clarenville and Bonavista Peninsula):
 Bishop White School
 Clarenville High School
 Discovery Collegiate
 Heritage Collegiate
 Random Island Academy
 Southwest Arm Academy
 St. Mark's School
 Swift Current Academy
 Tricentia Academy

Former Nova Central School District 
Avoca Collegiate in Badger
Baie Verte Collegiate in Baie Verte
Baie Verte Academy in Baie Verte
Bay d'Espoir Academy in St. Alban's
Bayview Primary in Nipper's Harbour
Botwood Collegiate in Botwood
Brian Peckford Elementary in Triton
Centreville Academy in Centreville-Wareham
Charlottetown Primary in Charlottetown
Cape John Collegiate in La Scie
Cottrells Cove Academy in Cottrell's Cove
Deckwood Primary in Woodstock
Dorset Collegiate in Pilley's Island
Exploits Valley Intermediate in Grand Falls-Windsor
Exploits Valley High in Grand Falls-Windsor
Fitzgerald Academy in English Harbour West
Fogo Island Central Academy in Fogo Island Central
Gander Academy in Gander
Gander Collegiate in Gander
Gander Elementary in Gander
Gill Memorial Academy in Musgrave Harbour
Glovertown Academy in Glovertown
Green Bay South Academy in Robert's Arm
Greenwood Academy in Campbellton
Helen Tulk Elementary in Bishop's Falls
Heritage Academy in Greens Pond
Hillside Elementary in La Scie
Hillview Academy in Norris Arm South
H.L. Strong Academy in Little Bay Islands
Holy Cross School in Eastport
Indian River High School in Springdale
Indian River Academy in Springdale
J.M. Olds Collegiate in Twillingate
Jane Collins Academy in Hare Bay
John Watlkins Academy in Hermitage
King Academy in Harbour Breton
Lakewood Academy in Glenwood
Lester Pearson Memorial High in Wesleyville
Lewisporte Academy in Lewisporte
Lewisporte Collegiate in Lewisporte
Lewisporte Intermediate in Lewisporte
Lumsden School Complex in Lumsden
Lakeside Academy in Buchans
Leading Tickles Elementary in Leading Tickles
Leo Burke Academy in Bishop's Falls
Long Island Academy in Beaumont
Memorial Academy in Wesleyville
Memorial Academy in Botwood
M.S.B. Regional Academy in Middle Arm
Millcrest Academy in Grand Falls-Windsor
New World Island Academy in Summerford
Phoenix Academy in Carmanville
Point Leamington Academy in Point Leamington
Riverwood Academy in Wings Point
Sandstone Academy in Ladle Cove
Smallwood Academy in Gambo
St. Gabriel's All-Grade in St. Brendans
St. Paul's Intermediate in Gander
St. Stephen's All-Grade in Rencontre East
St. Peter's All-Grade in McCallum
St. Peter's Academy in Westport
St. Joseph's Elementary in Harbour Breton
Sprucewood Academy in Grand Falls-Windsor
Twillingate Island Elementary in Twillingate
Victoria Academy in Gaultois
Valmont Academy in King's Point
William Mercer Academy in Dover
Woodland Primary in Grand Falls-Windsor

Former Labrador School Board

Former Western School Board

References

External links

School districts in Newfoundland and Labrador
2013 establishments in Canada